Alexander Glebovich Nevzorov (born on 3 August 1958) is a Russian (since 2022, also Ukrainian) television journalist, film director and a former member of the Russian State Duma.

Early life and career 
Alexander Nevzorov was born on 3 August 1958 in Leningrad. He started working for the Leningrad television in 1985. From December 1987 to 1993, he hosted the program 600 Seconds on the Leningrad TV channel, aired then all over the Soviet Union. On 12 December 1990 he was shot and wounded during a meeting with someone who pretended to have sensitive documents to offer. In late 1991 his program was taken off the air twice and later gradually lost its popularity. During the 1991 coup d'état attempt, Nevzorov supported the State Committee on the State of Emergency, the organ of the coupists. Nevzorov formed the Nashi movement (not to be confused with the later pro-Putin youth movement of the same name). The broadcast was finally closed down in the aftermath of Yeltsin's victory in his confrontation with the Russian Supreme Soviet (Nevzorov had supported the anti-Yeltsin side).

Nevzorov worked as a reporter in the Yugoslav Wars and the Transnistria War in 1992–1993. 

In the 1993 campaign, Nevzorov was elected deputy in the State Duma of the Russian Federation for the first time, and after that was re-elected as an independent deputy three times, serving until the 2007 elections when the single constituency seats were abolished.

He served as an adviser on film, TV and radio to Vladimir Yakovlev during the latter's tenure as the Governor (mayor) of Saint Petersburg.

In 1994 Nevzorov was a vocal supporter of the initiation of the First Chechen War. In 1997 he wrote and directed the TV film Chistilishche ("Purgatory") about the Chechen war, co-produced with Boris Berezovsky and released in March 1998. As the Chechen War dragged on, his views changed and he became skeptical of Russian imperialism. He regretted his past nationalist positions, and said in 2015 about his involvement in Nashi: 

In 2003 Nevzorov collaborated with the ORT TV channel and often appeared as a political commentator on Sergey Dorenko's Saturday night news show.

In 2012, Nevzorov supported Vladimir Putin during his presidential campaign, and was his authorised representative. In 2014, however, Nevzorov opposed the Russian annexation of Crimea.

In 2017, Nevzorov was recognized as a saint by the Russian Church of the Flying Spaghetti Monster for promoting atheism.

In a video posted to YouTube on 11 April 2021, Nevzorov predicted that a possible Russian invasion of Ukraine would end in tragedy and humiliation for Russia. He also predicted fierce Ukrainian resistance.

On 22 March 2022, Nevzorov was charged under Russia's "false information" law after he published information that Russian forces had shelled a maternity hospital in Mariupol. Under a new law passed on 4 March, he could be sentenced to up to 15 years in prison. Nevzorov said that Vladimir Putin's "regime is not going to spare anyone, and that any attempts to comprehend the criminal war [in Ukraine] will end in prison." Nevzorov's wife Lidia stated on social media that her husband was in Israel.

On 22 April 2022, Nevzorov was added to the list of individuals acting as foreign agents.

In June 2022, Nevzorov and his wife Lidia submitted an application to the Ministry of Foreign Affairs of Ukraine for Ukrainian citizenship. On 3 June, Nevzorov and the State Migration Service of Ukraine confirmed that Nevzorov and his wife had received Ukrainian citizenship. On 6 June, Secretary of the National Security and Defense Council of Ukraine Oleksiy Danilov stated that Nevzorov did not yet have citizenship, but that he had only applied for it.

References

External links

 Official website
 
 A Onetime Star of Soviet TV Warns of the ‘Plague’ of Nationalism. The New York Times. July 19, 2019.

1958 births
Living people
20th-century Russian journalists
21st-century Russian journalists
Mass media people from Saint Petersburg
First convocation members of the State Duma (Russian Federation)
Second convocation members of the State Duma (Russian Federation)
Third convocation members of the State Duma (Russian Federation)
Fourth convocation members of the State Duma (Russian Federation)
Critics of religions
Echo of Moscow radio presenters
Pseudoscientific biologists
Russian activists against the 2022 Russian invasion of Ukraine
Russian atheism activists
Russian atheists
Russian columnists
Russian documentary filmmakers
Russian film directors
Russian male journalists
Russian opinion journalists
Russian reporters and correspondents
Russian screenwriters
Russian shooting survivors
Russian television presenters
Russian YouTubers
Soviet journalists
Soviet television presenters
TV Rain
Flying Spaghetti Monster
People listed in Russia as media foreign agents
Naturalized citizens of Ukraine